Crossotus is a genus of longhorn beetles of the subfamily Lamiinae.

 Crossotus albicollis Guérin-Méneville, 1844
 Crossotus albofasciculatus Breuning, 1971
 Crossotus arabicus Gahan, 1896
 Crossotus argenteus Hintz, 1912
 Crossotus barbatus Gerstäcker, 1871 
 Crossotus bifasciatus Kolbe, 1900
 Crossotus brunneopictus (Fairmaire, 1891)
 Crossotus capucinus (Gerstäcker, 1884)
 Crossotus erlangeri Hintz, 1912
 Crossotus falzonii Breuning, 1943
 Crossotus freoides Breuning, 1938
 Crossotus genalis Aurivillius, 1913
 Crossotus inermis Breuning, 1935
 Crossotus katbeh Sama, 1999
 Crossotus klugi Distant, 1892
 Crossotus nebulosus (Fairmaire, 1892)
 Crossotus plumicornis Audinet-Serville, 1835
 Crossotus plurifasciculatus Breuning, 1938
 Crossotus pseudostypticus Breuning, 1956
 Crossotus saxosicollis Fairmaire, 1893
 Crossotus schoutedeni Breuning, 1935
 Crossotus stigmaticus (Fahraeus, 1872)
 Crossotus strigifrons (Fairmaire, 1886)
 Crossotus stypticus Pascoe, 1869
 Crossotus sublineatus Gestro, 1892
 Crossotus subocellatus (Fairmaire, 1886)
 Crossotus tubericollis (Fairmaire, 1886)
 Crossotus ugandae Breuning, 1936
 Crossotus vagepictus (Fairmaire, 1886)
 Crossotus xanthoneurus Sama, 2000

References

 
Crossotini